Umatilla is a city in Umatilla County, Oregon,  United States.  The population in 2010 was 6,906, but the city's population includes approximately 2,000 inmates incarcerated at Two Rivers Correctional Institution. 

Umatilla is part of the Hermiston-Pendleton Micropolitan Statistical Area, but has the highest poverty rate (24%) and lowest Median Household Income ($38,796), of all communities in the area; trailing neighboring Hermiston in household income by nearly 23%.

The city is on the south side of the Columbia River along U.S. Route 730 and I-82.

History 

Before European settlement, the peninsula formed by the convergence of the Umatilla and Columbia rivers had been occupied by the indigenous Umatilla people for at least 10,000 years, being the site of temporary and seasonal villages, fishing and later horse breeding. On their return trip from the mouth of the Columbia River in 1806, the Lewis and Clark Expedition made note in their journals of a village on the site.

The Umatilla Indian Reservation was created in 1855 after the Walla Walla Council treaty and many of the Umatilla, Cayuse and Walla Walla tribes relocated there, with the vast majority of their lands being given over to the US government. Not long after, when gold was discovered in the Boise Basin of Idaho and in Montana in 1862, the Columbia River became an important passageway inland to the gold fields. That same year Timothy K. Davenport surveyed for a town site at the mouth of the Umatilla River and filed a plat in 1863. The site was chosen for its location just below the Umatilla Rapids, which formed a navigational headwater on the Columbia and prevented boats from traveling further upstream without needing to be portaged or needing their cargo transferred to a new boat above the rapids. The site was first known as Umatilla Landing, then Umatilla City, then Columbia, then Umatilla City once again over the next year or so. Its post office was established in 1863 with Z. F. Moody as postmaster.

Umatilla quickly became an important trade and distribution center not just for gold rush travelers but for the growing population of farmers and ranchers in the surrounding region. A business district developed along Water Street at the river's edge and at the town's peak it had 3 hotels, 22 saloons, 6 mercantiles and 3 grocery stores, among others. It won the county seat of Umatilla County by a small margin on March 6, 1865 But would only remain so until 1868 when it was moved to the burgeoning village of Pendleton. That same year the first newspaper (A tri-weekly) was established. For a brief time during the gold rush in the 1860s there was competition between Umatilla and Wallula, Washington to become the "Sacramento of the Upper Columbia" but the gold rush wouldn't last long enough to support either town's growth beyond frontier villages.

Umatilla remained a vital commercial center until the late 1870s, when the removal of the rapids in 1877 allowed boats traveling from The Dalles to continue directly to Wallula and beyond. The following year the Oregon Steam Navigation Company began construction of a narrow gauge railroad that would connect Umatilla to the agricultural inland, passing from Pendleton to Weston. The great flood of 1894 destroyed what was left of the original business district and many surviving buildings were moved away from the river. The Umatilla Masonic Lodge Hall, one of the only surviving buildings from the original townsite, was relocated to Echo, Oregon, 14 miles to the southeast in 1901. By the early 1910s, Umatilla was making a resurgence as an agricultural center and a new business district was forming along 3rd and 4th Streets, facing away from the river and towards the railroad tracks. Once again the town had several hotels and even a bank. In 1916 several women launched secret bids for local office, resulting in what has been called the Petticoat Revolution.

The Umatilla Chemical Depot opened in 1941, to prepare for World War II. The depot's mission was to store and maintain a variety of military items, from blankets to ammunition. The depot took on its chemical weapons storage mission in 1962. From 1990 to 1994 the facility reorganized in preparation for eventual closure, shipping all conventional ammunition and supplies to other installations. On October 25, 2011, the last barrel of HD mustard agent was destroyed and there is no longer a risk of chemical accident in Oregon and Washington.

The original town site of Umatilla was abandoned completely when the United States Corps of Engineers determined that it would likely be inundated by the construction of the John Day Dam. Between 1965 and 1968 the town was completely rebuilt south of the railroad tracks and all of the buildings on the original townsite were bought and demolished. The relocation would turn out to be for naught as the water level at this point in the river was not affected by the dam's reservoir. Umatilla's original street grid can still be seen north of the railroad tracks and is now a nature preserve and protected archaeological site. It is still owned by the Corps of Engineers and is not accessible to the public.

Geography

Climate
According to the Köppen Climate Classification system, Umatilla has a semi-arid climate, abbreviated "BSk" on climate maps.

Demographics

2010 census
As of the census of 2010, there were 6,906 people, 1,634 households, and 1,215 families residing in the city. The racial makeup of the city was 70.1% White, 2.3% African American, 1.5% Native American, 0.6% Asian, 23.1% from other races, and 2.4% from two or more races. Hispanic or Latino of any race were 43.1% of the population.

There were 1,634 households, of which 50.8% had children under the age of 18 living with them, 51.2% were married couples living together, 14.7% had a female householder with no husband present, 8.5% had a male householder with no wife present, and 25.6% were non-families. 18.5% of all households were made up of individuals, and 6% had someone living alone who was 65 years of age or older. The average household size was 3.15 and the average family size was 3.59.

The median age in the city was 30.7 years. 26.1% of residents were under the age of 18; 11.7% were between the ages of 18 and 24; 35.6% were from 25 to 44; 20.2% were from 45 to 64; and 6.3% were 65 years of age or older. The gender makeup of the city was 63.7% male and 36.3% female.

2000 census
As of the census of 2000, there were 4,978 people, 1,364 households, and 1,062 families residing in the city. The population density was 1,415.3 people per square mile (546.0/km2). There were 1,511 housing units at an average density of 429.6 per square mile (165.7/km2). The racial makeup of the city was 72.10% White, 2.69% African American, 1.35% Native American, 0.38% Asian, 0.06% Pacific Islander, 21.49% from other races, and 1.93% from two or more races.  Hispanic or Latino of any race were 32.58% of the population.

There were 1,364 households, out of which 45.7% had children under the age of 18 living with them, 58.2% were married couples living together, 13.0% had a female householder with no husband present, and 22.1% were non-families. 16.9% of all households were made up of individuals, and 5.1% had someone living alone who was 65 years of age or older. The average household size was 3.14 and the average family size was 3.51.

In the city, the population was spread out, with 31.0% under the age of 18, 12.1% from 18 to 24, 34.7% from 25 to 44, 16.5% from 45 to 64, and 5.7% who were 65 years of age or older. The median age was 29 years. For every 100 females, there were 137.8 males. For every 100 females age 18 and over, there were 157.3 males.

The median income for a household in the city was $33,844, and the median income for a family was $32,969. Males had a median income of $28,500 versus $20,337 for females. The per capita income for the city was $11,469. About 15.6% of families and 19.4% of the population were below the poverty line, including 24.2% of those under age 18 and 21.1% of those age 65 or over.

Economy
The city has seen some industrial investment in recent years through Amazon Web Service's data centers, however wages have stagnated.  The 2017 median household income in Umatilla of $38,796 represented a decline of 7.3% from 2010, and has fallen well behind nearby Hermiston at $50,694. The local economy is heavily reliant on agriculture and supporting services. As of 2001, the five largest employers in Umatilla were the Two Rivers Correctional Institution, JM Manufacturing (polyvinyl chloride pipes), Gilroy Food (dehydrated onions), Boise Cascade (wood chips), and Oregon Rustic (pine furniture).

See also
Ordnance, Oregon
Umatilla, Florida

References

External links
 Entry for Umatilla in the Oregon Blue Book
, Photos, bibliography, oral histories

Cities in Oregon
Cities in Umatilla County, Oregon
Populated places established in 1851
Oregon populated places on the Columbia River
Port cities in Oregon
Pendleton–Hermiston Micropolitan Statistical Area
1851 establishments in Oregon Territory
Former county seats in Oregon